The Social Democratic Party was a political party formed by Persian emigrants in Transcaucasia with the help of local revolutionaries, maintaining close ties to the Russian Social Democratic Labour Party and Hemmat Party.

It was the first Iranian socialist organization.

The party created its own mélange of European socialism and indigenous ideas and upheld liberalism and nationalism. It maintained some religious beliefs while being critical of the conservative ulama and embracing separation of church and state.

References

1900s establishments in Iran
1910 disestablishments in Asia
1910s disestablishments in Iran
Anti-clerical parties
Defunct liberal political parties
Defunct nationalist parties
Defunct socialist parties in Iran
Defunct social democratic parties
Iranian nationalism
Liberal parties in Iran
Nationalist parties in Iran
Political parties disestablished in 1910
Political parties established in the 1900s
Political parties in Qajar Iran
Radical parties
Secularism in Iran
Social democratic parties in Asia